NRCA may refer to:

North Raleigh Christian Academy, a Christian school in Raleigh, North Carolina, United States
National Roofing Contractors Association, national association of professional roofing contractors